The 2022 NCAA Division I men's soccer season was the 64th season of NCAA championship men's college soccer.

The season began in August 2022 and concluded in November. It  culminated with the 2022 NCAA Division I Men's Soccer Tournament, with the Men's College Cup held at WakeMed Soccer Park in Cary, North Carolina.

Syracuse won the NCAA Championship by defeating Indiana 7-6 on penalty kicks following a 2-2-draw.

Changes from 2021

Rule changes 
In April 2022, during a meeting among the NCAA Playing Rules Oversight Panel (PROP), several major rule changes were enacted. This included overtime, expansion of video assistant referee (VAR), and the appeals process of a suspension.

Specifically overtime was abolished during the regular season. Matches that ended in a draw during a conference or national tournament match would go to extra time, consisting of two 10-minute periods without a golden goal. A playoff game tied after two overtime periods would still move to a penalty kick shoot-out with the winner determined by the teams alternating kicks from the penalty mark. Additionally PROP approved VAR to be used for fouls that occurred outside of the penalty area, as well as allowing a 48-hour period to appeal a red card decision.

Coaching changes 
A total of 24 coaching changes took place during the 2021–22 offseason. One head coach announced his retirement after the 2021 season, but backed out of his retirement plan and was rehired by his program.

New programs
Two members of the NCAA Division II Great Lakes Valley Conference (GLVC) announced in February 2022 that they would reclassify to NCAA Division I as new members of the Ohio Valley Conference (OVC) effective that July. The first to announce was the University of Southern Indiana on February 9. Lindenwood University followed suit on February 23. With the OVC sponsoring soccer only for women, both schools entered into negotiations with the Summit League, whose men's soccer league included established OVC member Eastern Illinois. The Summit accepted both Lindenwood and Southern Indiana as associate members on May 11.

On May 22, 2022, the ASUN Conference announced that Queens University of Charlotte, then a member of the South Atlantic Conference, would begin its own transition to Division I and become the newest ASUN member.

On April 5, 2022, Stonehill College announced that it had accepted an invitation to join the Northeast Conference and would begin the transition to Division I.

Discontinued programs 
While no schools dropped men's soccer prior to the 2022 fall season, one conference discontinued its men's soccer league. Conference USA had nine men's soccer members in 2021, and had planned to add another such member for 2022, but lost all of them by the end of the 2021–22 school year. First, in April 2022, it was announced that five of its members (Coastal Carolina, Kentucky, Marshall, Old Dominion, and South Carolina) would join the Sun Belt Conference for the fall 2022 season, as would West Virginia, which had previously announced a planned move of men's soccer from the Mid-American Conference to C-USA. One month later, the remaining four members (Charlotte, FIU, Florida Atlantic, and UAB) announced they would join the American Athletic Conference effective fall 2022. Of these last four schools, all but FIU are scheduled to fully join The American in 2023.

The Hartford Hawks will transition to NCAA Division III. However, they continue to honor athletic scholarships previously awarded, and departed the America East Conference to become a Division I independent for the 2022 season. The Hawks will join the D-III Commonwealth Coast Conference in 2023.

Conference realignment 
Twenty-seven schools joined new conferences or became independents, including four schools from Division II which started transitions to Division I this season and one that started a transition from Division I to Division III in the 2021 season.

Incarnate Word (UIW) was an affiliate member of the Western Athletic Conference (WAC) for men's soccer in 2021. They had announced their intent to move their primary conference affiliation from the Southland Conference to the WAC, but on June 24, 2022 announced a reversal of course to retain the Southland Conference as their primary conference. There was no formal announcement that they would discontinue their affiliation with the WAC for men's soccer; however, they were removed from the WAC soccer schedule, and played an independent schedule in the 2022 season.

Other headlines 
 November 10, 2021—The Utah legislature approved the rebranding of Dixie State University to Utah Tech University. The name change occurred in May 2022, with the change taking legal effect on July 1, 2022. The athletic nickname of Trailblazers was not affected.
 August 12 – The Indiana University and Purdue University systems announced that Indiana University–Purdue University Indianapolis will be dissolved in 2024 and replaced by separate IU- and Purdue-affiliated institutions. The current athletic program, the IUPUI Jaguars, will transfer to the new IU Indianapolis.
 August 31 – The Division I Board of Directors adopted a series of changes to transfer rules.
 Transfer windows were adopted for all Division I sports. Student-athletes who wish to be immediately eligible at their next school must enter the NCAA transfer portal within the designated period(s) for their sport. For men's soccer, two windows were established—a 45-day winter window starting the day after the NCAA tournament selections are announced, and a spring window from May 1–15.
 Student-athletes who experience head coaching changes, or those whose athletic aid is reduced, canceled, or not renewed, may transfer outside designated windows without penalty.
 Transferring student-athletes are guaranteed their financial aid at their next school through graduation.
 September 21 – Houston Baptist University announced it had changed its name to Houston Christian University, effective immediately. The athletic nickname of Huskies was not affected.
 November 11 – The Mid-American Conference (MAC) announced that it would no longer sponsor men's soccer after the 2022 season, citing its recent reductions in membership in that sport. Three of the four full MAC members that sponsor men's soccer—Bowling Green, Northern Illinois, and Western Michigan—announced that day that they would become single-sport members of the Missouri Valley Conference effective in 2023.
 November 16 – The Big East Conference announced that Akron, the last full MAC member that had yet to announce a men's soccer affiliation beyond 2022, would join Big East men's soccer effective with the 2023 season. At that time, the Big East, whose 11 full members all sponsor men's soccer, split into divisions for that sport.

Season outlook

Preseason polls 

United Soccer Coaches released their preseason poll on August 2, 2022. College Soccer News released their preseason poll on August 18, 2022. TopDrawer Soccer released their rankings on August 19, 2022.

Regular season

Major upsets 
In this list, a "major upset" is defined as a game won by an unranked team that defeats a ranked team, or a team ranked 10 spots lower than the other team.

All rankings are from the United Soccer Coaches Poll.

Conference standings

Early season tournaments 
Several universities hosted early season soccer tournaments.

Postseason

Conference winners and tournaments

Player statistics

Goals

Assists

Points
. Two points per a goal, and one point per an assist.

Hat tricks

Awards and honors

TopDrawerSoccer.com Player/Team of the Week
Bold denotes TDS Player of the Week.

All-America teams

Major player of the year awards 
 Hermann Trophy: Duncan McGuire, Creighton
 TopDrawerSoccer.com National Player of the Year Award: Duncan McGuire, Creighton

Other major awards 
 United Soccer Coaches College Coach of the Year: Ian McIntyre, Syracuse
 Bill Jeffrey Award: 
 Jerry Yeagley Award: Kristin Acquavella
 Mike Berticelli Award: Felicity Day
 NCAA Tournament MVP:Offensive: Nathan Opoku Defensive: Russell Shealy

Conference player and coaches of the year

See also 
 College soccer
 List of NCAA Division I men's soccer programs
 2022 in American soccer
 2022 NCAA Division I Men's Soccer Tournament
 2022 NCAA Division I women's soccer season

References 

 
NCAA